Joaquín Ramírez de Arellano (fl. 1927) was a lawyer, professor and a journalist in the Philippines.

Career
He was a lawyer and a Spanish professor in the University of Santo Tomas. He then ventured into journalism wherein he worked as a reporter and then editor-in-chief of La Defensa.

Award
He was a recipient of the Premio Zobel in 1927 for his dramatic comedy Mrs. Morton.

References
 Brillantes, Lourdes. 81 Years of Premio Zobel: A Legacy of Philippine Literature in Spanish. Philippines:Filipinas Heritage Library, 2006. 

Year of birth missing
Year of death missing
20th-century Filipino lawyers
Spanish-language writers of the Philippines
Filipino journalists
Academic staff of the University of Santo Tomas